441 may refer to:
 the year 441
 the number 441
 4-4-1, a band
 U.S. Route 441
 Wisconsin Highway 441
 Juggling pattern#441